Maurice Charles Lisby (September 17, 1912 – September 6, 1995) was an American Negro league pitcher in the 1930s.

A native of Manayunk, Pennsylvania, Lisby attended Morgan State University and played for the Bacharach Giants and the Newark Dodgers in 1934. He died in Jamaica, New York in 1995 at age 82.

References

External links
 and Seamheads

1912 births
1995 deaths
Bacharach Giants players
Newark Dodgers players
Baseball pitchers
Baseball players from Philadelphia
20th-century African-American sportspeople